A digital raster graphic (DRG) is a digital image resulting from scanning a paper USGS topographic map for use on a computer.  DRGs created by USGS are typically scanned at 250 dpi and saved as a TIFF.  The raster image usually includes the original border information, referred to as the "map collar".  The map file is UTM projected and georeferenced to the surface of the earth.  DRG's are regularly used in GIS applications. DRGs were first produced in 1995.

See also
GeoTIFF

External links

 Libre Map Project 
 All 50 States USGS Topographic Maps on the Internet Archive
 USGS Topographic Maps of ALL 50 States
 USGS Sites
 Digital Raster Graphics
 Earth Explorer (GeoTIFFs)
 Map Locator (GeoPDFs)
Kentucky Raster Graphics Image Download Center
 Montana State Library Digital Raster Graphics download page
 Pennsylvania Spatial Data Access sites
 Digital Raster Graphics for PA (free)
 Digital raster graphics without collar info for PA (free)
 FTP site, DRGs for West Virginia (free)
 FTP site, DRGs for New York (free)
 FTP site, DRGs for Virginia (free)
 FTP site, DRGs for Maryland (free)
 FTP site, DRGs for Washington DC (free)
 FTP site, DRGs for Delaware (free)
 FTP site, DRGs for North Carolina (free)
Texas Natural Resources Information System
 DRGs without collars organized by county

Cartography
GIS file formats
United States Geological Survey